San San Thein (born 10 July 1981) is a Burmese football manager and a former footballer who played as a defender and a defensive midfielder. She has been a member of the Myanmar women's national team.

Early life
San San Thein was born in Kyangin, Ayeyarwady Division.

International career
San San Thein capped for Myanmar at senior level during the 2010 AFC Women's Asian Cup (including the qualifiers). She was also part of the 2006 AFF Women's Championship and the 2008 AFC Women's Asian Cup processes.

Managerial career
San San Thein has managed the Myanmar women's national under-16 football team.

References 

1981 births
Living people
People from Ayeyarwady Region
Burmese women's footballers
Women's association football defenders
Myanmar women's international footballers
Burmese football managers
Women's association football managers
Female association football managers